François-Antoine Robit or Citoyen Robit (1752 – August 29, 1815) was a French art collector whose collection was sold during the Napoleonic period in Paris in 1801.

Michael Bryan had obtained funds from Sir Simon Clarke and George Hibbert to purchase 51 paintings from the Robit collection sale which he exhibited in his gallery on Savile Row in November 1801. In fact, he brought about 80 items from the Robit sale that were later acquired by Hibbert and Clarke.

Among the paintings were:

References 

 A catalogue of the celebrated assemblage of capital pictures, brought from Paris, principally from Mr. Robit's famous collection and other distinguished cabinets : which will be exhibited for sale by private contract, on Friday, the 6th of November, 1801, and following days, at Mr. Bryan's Gallery (catalog in English, by Bryan in London later in 1801)
 Catalogue d'une riche collection de tableaux des plus grands maîtres des trois écoles ... tout provenant du célébre cabinet du citoyen Robit (catalog in French for 1801 sale)

1752 births
1815 deaths
French art collectors